Psalm 43 is the 43rd psalm of the Book of Psalms, known in the English King James Version as "Judge me, O God, and plead my cause against an ungodly nation". In the slightly different numbering system used in the Greek Septuagint and Latin Vulgate translations of the Bible, this psalm is Psalm 42. In Latin, it is known as "Iudica me Deus". It is commonly attributed to the sons of Korah. In the Hebrew Bible, it comes within the second of the five books (divisions) of Psalms, also known as the "Elohistic Psalter" because the word YHWH is rarely used and God is generally referred to as "Elohim".

The psalm forms a regular part of Jewish, Catholic, Lutheran, Anglican and other Protestant liturgies.

Text

Hebrew Bible version 
Following is the Hebrew text of Psalm 43:

King James Version 
 Judge me, O God, and plead my cause against an ungodly nation: O deliver me from the deceitful and unjust man.
 For thou art the God of my strength: why dost thou cast me off? why go I mourning because of the oppression of the enemy?
 O send out thy light and thy truth: let them lead me; let them bring me unto thy holy hill, and to thy tabernacles.
 Then will I go unto the altar of God, unto God my exceeding joy: yea, upon the harp will I praise thee, O God my God.
 Why art thou cast down, O my soul? and why art thou disquieted within me? hope in God: for I shall yet praise him, who is the health of my countenance, and my God.

Verse 1
Vindicate me, O God,And plead my cause against an ungodly nation;
Oh, deliver me from the deceitful and unjust man!
"An ungodly nation" comes from words literally meaning a nation without Chesed, meaning kindness or love between people. Alexander Kirkpatrick notes that the "deceitful and unjust man" may be the leader of this nation, who may have "distinguished himself by treachery and malignity", but "it is better to understand the words collectively as a further description of the 'inhuman nation' in general, men of deceit and malignity".

Uses

Catholic Church 
This psalm was traditionally recited or sung, from the rule of St. Benedict of 530 AD, in the Office for the Lauds of Tuesday, following Psalm 50.

Above all, it is the psalm the priest recites before ascending the altar to celebrate Mass. In the traditional Roman Rite (also known as the Tridentine Mass or Extraordinary Form), the psalm is recited by the priest and altar servers during the prayers at the foot of the altar. The recitation of this psalm at the beginning of Mass was suppressed in 1964 with the Instruction on Implementing Liturgical Norms, Inter Oecumenici.

In the Liturgy of the Hours today, Psalm 43 is recited or sung at Lauds of Tuesday of the second week of the four-week psalter.

Book of Common Prayer
In the Church of England's Book of Common Prayer, this psalm is appointed to be read on the evening of the eighth day of the month.

Latin translations

Clementine Vulgate 

The Clementine Vulgate was officially adopted as part of the Roman Breviary in 1592. It had also been in use in dialogue form as a preparation for Mass, in what is now called the Extraordinary Form.

Pian translation

The Pian psalter was completed in 1945 and printed in most Breviaries thereafter.

Nova Vulgata

The Nova Vulgata, a new translation from the Hebrew was completed in 1979 for liturgical use. It is the version used in the current typical edition of the Liturgia Horarum.

Stuttgart Vulgate

The Stuttgart Vulgate, completed in 1969, is a non-liturgical version translated for scholarly use.

Musical settings 
Heinrich Schütz wrote a setting of a paraphrase in German, "Gott, führ mein Sach und richte mich", SWV 140, for the Becker Psalter, published first in 1628. Michel Richard Delalande wrote a grand motet (S.38) to this psalm in 1693.

References

External links 

 
 
  in Hebrew and English – Mechon-mamre
 Text of Psalm 43 according to the 1928 Psalter
 Grant me justice, O God; defend me from a faithless people; from the deceitful and unjust rescue me.a text and footnotes, usccb.org United States Conference of Catholic Bishops
 Psalm 43:1 introduction and text, biblestudytools.com
 Psalm 43 – From Depression to a Procession of Praise enduringword.com
 Psalm 43 / Give judgement for me, O God, and defend my cause against an ungodly people. Church of England
 Psalm 43 at biblegateway.com
 Hymns for Psalm 43 hymnary.org

043